The following is a list of public holidays in Abkhazia. The working days are marked in cursive.

References

Culture of Abkhazia
Abkhazia
Holidays
Abkhazia